"Don't Ask Me Why" is a song recorded by British pop music duo Eurythmics, released as the second single from their seventh album, We Too Are One (1989). The song was written by bandmembers Annie Lennox and David A. Stewart and produced by Stewart with Jimmy Iovine. In the US, it was released as the first single from the album. It is a lush pop song with melancholy and bitter lyrics which describe the ending of a love relationship. In it Lennox tells the subject "don't ask me why / I don't love you any more / I don't think I ever did".

Chart performance
"Don't Ask Me Why" peaked at number twenty-five in the UK singles chart and became Eurythmics' last US Billboard Hot 100 hit (and last top 40 hit), peaking at number forty (and twelve on the US Modern Rock Chart).

Critical reception
American magazine Billboard described the song as a "subdued midtempo number", adding, "Lennox's vocal shines on a track that's not as immediate as prior releases but could easily be a sleeper." Mick Williams of the Lennox Herald gave the song a 9.5 out of 10 rating and commented: "If there ever was any doubt that Annie Lennox's voice was a gift from heaven, "Don't Ask Me Why" confirms it." A reviewer from Music & Media felt its appeal stemmed from the "poignant contrast between [the] enchanting harmonies and sad lyrics". 

David Giles from Music Week wrote, "A distinct improvement on the rather histrionic blues of "Revival", this more subdued song allows Lennox's voice room for more expressiveness, and Stewart restrains himself admirably until an uncharacteristically twangy guitar break." Iestyn George of Record Mirror considered "Don't Ask Me Why" to be "a great deal meaner and moodier than the half-baked "Revival", but will probably get lost among the plethora of pop-dance records cluttering up the airwaves."

Music video
The song's accompanying music video, directed by Sophie Muller, features a performance by Eurythmics with various members of a backing band.  Filmed in bright, saturated colors the finished clip drew comparisons to nightclub scenes in David Lynch's film Blue Velvet.

Track listings
 7" (UK, GER, FR, SPA, AUS, USA, CAN) & K7 Single (UK, AUS, USA, CAN) & CD single (JAP)
 "Don't Ask Me Why" (LP Version) – 4:21
 "Rich Girl" (Non-LP Track) – 4:09

 12" (UK, GER) & CD single (UK, GER)
 "Don't Ask Me Why" (LP Version) – 4:21
 "Sylvia" (LP Version) – 4:35
 "Rich Girl" (Non-LP Track) – 4:09

 Limited 12" (UK) & Limited CD single Box-Set (UK)
 "Don't Ask Me Why" (LP Version) – 4:21
 "Rich Girl" (Non-LP Track) – 4:09
 "When The Day Goes Down" (Acoustic Version) – 3:47
 "Don't Ask Me Why" (Acoustic Version) – 3:58

Charts

References 

1989 songs
1989 singles
Eurythmics songs
Music videos directed by Sophie Muller
RCA Records singles
Songs written by Annie Lennox
Songs written by David A. Stewart
Song recordings produced by Dave Stewart (musician and producer)